Vasyl Vasylyovych Shved (born 11 December 1971) is a former professional footballer who played as a forward.

Career
Shved began his playing career with FC Hazovyk Komarno in the Ukrainian Second League. In 1999–2000 he was a top scorer of the Second League, playing for the Komarno team. He moved to Ukrainian Premier League side FC Karpaty Lviv in July 2000.

Personal life
His oldest son Maryan Shved is also a professional footballer.

External links
Statistics at UAF website

1971 births
Living people
Sportspeople from Lviv Oblast
Ukrainian footballers
Association football forwards
Ukrainian Premier League players
Ukrainian First League players
Ukrainian Second League players
FC Karpaty Lviv players
KS Lublinianka players
FC Hazovyk Komarno players
FC Nyva Ternopil players
FC Hazovyk-Skala Stryi players
FC Tekhno-Centre Rohatyn players
FC Halychyna Lviv players
FC Karpaty-2 Lviv players
FC Karpaty-3 Lviv players
Lviv State University of Physical Culture alumni